On 18 October 1989, a Soviet Air Force Ilyushin Il 76 carrying paratroopers of the 98th Guards Airborne Division crashed into the Caspian Sea, killing all 57 people on board. It is the deadliest aviation accident to occur in Azerbaijan.

Accident 
The aircraft was carrying paratroopers home from a mission during the Nagorno-Karabakh conflict back to Ukraine. The aircraft was also carrying military property including the GAZ-66. Five minutes after takeoff the no 1 engine caught fire and separated from the aircraft, striking the fuel tank in the process, resulting in an in-flight fire. the crew attempted to return to Nasonaya Air Base, but the fire caused the left wing to separate. The aircraft crashed into the Caspian Sea off of Sumgait.

Investigation 
The cause of the accident was an engine design flaw. The inter-shaft bearing had failed, leading to the low-pressure turbine shaft fracturing from heat.

Legacy 

 The occupants were posthumously awarded the order "For Personal Courage".
 Monuments were built in Bolhrad, Ivanovo, Hvardiiske Dnipropetrovsk Oblast, and in Аrtsyz, Odessa Oblast.
 The Blue Berets wrote a song called dedicated to the crew.

References 

History of Baku
1989 in Azerbaijan
Aviation accidents and incidents caused by in-flight fires
Accidents and incidents involving the Ilyushin Il-76
October 1989 events
Aviation accidents and incidents in Azerbaijan
20th-century disasters in Azerbaijan
1989 disasters in the Soviet Union
Aviation accidents and incidents in the Soviet Union